The 452nd Anti-Aircraft Artillery battalion was an all-African-American mobile anti-aircraft artillery unit of the US Army during the Second World War. Comprising fewer than 1,000 soldiers, including support staff, it is credited with having destroyed 88 German warplanes, 68 of which were fully confirmed kills and 19 partially confirmed kills. 

The 452nd "AAA" fought in nearly every major Allied land campaign in the European Theater of Operations, including Normandy, Northern France, Ardennes-Alsace, Rhineland and Central Europe. The 452nd AAA landed in Normandy on June 23, 1944.  The 452nd AAA also participated in the Battle of the Bulge and was a part of General Patton's famous rescue of the besieged town of Bastogne. In its participation in the defense of a bridge crossing of the Rhine River near Oppenheim on 22 March 1944, the 452nd shot down many attacking German planes and during one 24 hour period destroyed 10.

Prior to the invasion of France, the 452nd also participated in the defense of London from Nazi airplane attack.

References

Air defense artillery battalions of the United States Army
Battalions of the United States Army in World War II